This is a partial list of football clubs in the Northern Mariana Islands.

Clubs
IFC Wild Bills
Inter Godfather's
Kanoa FC
KFAS
Matansa Football Club
Marianas Pacific United Football Club
Paire FC
Tan Holdings FC
Tinian Premier FC

Northern Mariana Islands
 
Football clubs